Whau Ward is an Auckland Council ward which elects one councillor and covers the Whau Local Board. The current councillor is Kerrin Leoni.

Demographics

Whau ward had a population of 79,356 at the 2018 New Zealand census, an increase of 6,762 people (9.3%) since the 2013 census, and an increase of 10,185 people (14.7%) since the 2006 census. There were 24,675 households, comprising 39,639 males and 39,717 females, giving a sex ratio of 1.0 males per female. The median age was 34.4 years (compared with 37.4 years nationally), with 15,000 people (18.9%) aged under 15 years, 18,480 (23.3%) aged 15 to 29, 36,252 (45.7%) aged 30 to 64, and 9,624 (12.1%) aged 65 or older.

Ethnicities were 40.4% European/Pākehā, 9.9% Māori, 18.7% Pacific peoples, 40.3% Asian, and 3.9% other ethnicities. People may identify with more than one ethnicity.

The percentage of people born overseas was 47.1, compared with 27.1% nationally.

Although some people chose not to answer the census's question about religious affiliation, 36.5% had no religion, 36.5% were Christian, 0.6% had Māori religious beliefs, 10.7% were Hindu, 5.6% were Muslim, 2.3% were Buddhist and 2.6% had other religions.

Of those at least 15 years old, 18,240 (28.3%) people had a bachelor's or higher degree, and 9,210 (14.3%) people had no formal qualifications. The median income was $29,600, compared with $31,800 nationally. 9,174 people (14.3%) earned over $70,000 compared to 17.2% nationally. The employment status of those at least 15 was that 32,553 (50.6%) people were employed full-time, 8,247 (12.8%) were part-time, and 2,871 (4.5%) were unemployed.

Councillors

Election Results 
Election Results for the Whau Ward:

2022 Election Results

2019 Election Results

References

Wards of the Auckland Region
West Auckland, New Zealand